Abbaspur is a Tehsil located near line of control which divides Pakistan administered Kashmir and as like Indian administered Kashmir. It used to be called Gopalpur before its name was changed. It is the sub-divisional headquarters of district, Rawalakot, Poonch, Azad Kashmir.

Location

References 

Populated places in Poonch District, Pakistan
Tehsils of Poonch District